The men's 4 × 100 metres relay at the 2021 World Athletics U20 Championships was held at the Kasarani Stadium on 21 and 22 August.

Records

Results

Heats

Qualification: First 3 of each heat ( Q ) plus the 2 fastest times ( q ) qualified for the final.

Final

The final was held on 22 August at 16:46.

References

Relay 4 x 100 metres
Relays at the World Athletics U20 Championships